G. senegalensis  may refer to:
 Galago senegalensis, the Senegal bushbaby, Senegal galago, lesser galago or lesser bush baby, a small nocturnal primate species
 Gibbula senegalensis, a sea snail species
 Guiera senegalensis, a flowering plant species

See also
 Senegalensis (disambiguation)